The "Grodzka Gate – NN Theatre" Centre is a cultural institution based in Lublin. It is housed in the Grodzka Gate also known as the Jewish Gate that historically used to be a passage from the Christian to the Jewish part of the city. In its activities the Center focuses on issues of cultural heritage. The Polish-Jewish past of Lublin is the corner stone of the art and educational programmes carried out by the "Gate".

History and Theater activities of the Center 
NN Theater was established in 1990 in Lublin Drama Group, accommodated at that time in the Grodzka Gate and adjoining buildings. In 1998 the theater became a detached, independent organization and received its current name Ośrodek "Brama Grodzka — Teatr NN".

In its infancy theater staged the plays based on works of Kafka, Hrabal and other authors. 
As Tomasz Pietrasiewicz explains, literary adaptation of Herman Melville novel "Moby-Dick" played on the stage in June 1995 became a farewell to the certain period of producer's theater life. When after a long break he returned to stage direction again, the spotlight shifted to the storytelling.

The center also organizes festivals, such as "Miasto Poezji" and "Śladami Singera".

Expositions in the "Grodzka Gate" 
Building of the center has hosted many expositions, though its structure, characterized by a range of narrow corridors, some dead-end ones, is far from being an idyllic place for a "typical" exhibition. Thus, their creators had to "fit" their exhibit items in the space available.

In 2010 with financial endorsement of the Ministry of Culture and National Heritage of the Republic of Poland an exposition "Lublin. Pamięć Miejsca" was launched and has been operating ever since. It included some objects from the previous display "Portrait of the Place" and was enriched by some multimedia materials. One of the halls opens to visitors’ eyes a "Wall of voices" – boxes with installed speaker system. Pressing on one of the buttons you can listen to the stories about old Lublin – its smells, tastes, and sounds.

Numerous pieces of Kaiserpanorama, accompanying visitors through the whole course of exhibition, offer to have a look at pictures of interwar Lublin. In addition, there is a room dedicated to the Holocaust victims with seventy coloured photos of Lublin ghetto, taken by a German soldier Max Kirnberger. In 2012 new photos were added to the gallery. They had been found on the roof of the building on Rynek 4 during its renovation. There, under the leads, wrapped in papers and rags 2,700 photocopies were discovered. The owners of the house handed them over to the "Grodzka Gate" for a period of ten years. Author of the photos is still unknown.

A separate room is devoted to the Righteous Among the Nations from Lublin region (people who had been rescuing Jews during the Holocaust). It is a place, where visitors can read their personal stories and listen to their reminiscences. Another eye-catching item of the exposition are models of the old part of the city in 1930s – one actual and one multimedia one with replicas of 840 buildings, such as town houses, shops, synagogues etc.

Historical and educational activities of "The Grodzka Gate – NN Theater"

"Poemat o Miejscu" 

Jewish district had existed around Lublin Castle since the late 14th century, until it was laid waste by the Nazi in November 1943 after the liquidation of Lublin ghetto. Nowadays a bus station and lanes occupy its place, whereas the main street of the Jewish district – Szeroka – gave way to an asphalted parking lot.

Hence, in order to prevent from oblivion the memory of Jewish life that existed there, the Center organizes mystery of memory «Poemat o Miejscu». The event took place in the night time on March at 2002 and 2004. At the site of the whole former Jewish ghetto lights go down, creating a striking contrast with other parts of the city humming with life and pitch black territory around the castle. An unusual route awaits participants of this event. Setting off at Grodka Gate they follow to none-existing now Synagogue Maharszala. On their way pillars of light are coming from the open sewer manholes and voices are echoing across the streets. These are recorded audio materials of the stories told by the inmates of Lublin castle prison and local inhabitants, who witnessed the times of ghetto functioning and liquidation. Getting closer to Tysiąclecia Ave., even bus station loud-speakers start to ring with voices, but having reached the synagogue, participants see that their way is blocked with a heavy black curtain.

In 2004 another symbol of now vanished Jewish district appeared in Lublin. An original street lantern on Podwale St. that has remained there since the prewar times (now adapted for electricity) embodies Jewish presence in the area. It was lit as a commemoration token during the second mystery of memory "Poem of the Place" and has been on ever since, night and day.

"One Land – Two Temples" 

Mystery of memory «Jedna Ziemia — Dwie Świątynie» was organized within the framework of the Congress of Christian Culture, held in Lublin on September 15–17, 2000. It was a wide-scale event with around two thousand attendees. The Chief Rabbi of Poland, Michael Schudrich, gathered some soil into the pot from the place, where synagogue Maharszala used to stand. Józef Życiński, the Roman Catholic Metropolitan Archbishop of Lublin, collected the soil from the place, where St. Michael Roman Catholic Church stood. Then, these pots with soil were passed from hand to hand – Catholics were represented by Lublin youth and righteous among the nations, Jews – by the Jewish survivors of World War II and youth from a twin-town Rishon Le Zion. In the passage of Grodzka Gate, a symbolic place of unity of Christian and Judaic cultures, the soil from two pots was blended in one large barrel by a Polish and a Jewish child and professor of John Paul II Catholic University of Lublin, Romuald Jakub Weksler-Waszkinel. Afterwards, a grapevine was planted in that barrel.

Professor Weksler-Waszkinel was not selected to perform that honoured task by chance. He is a Roman Catholic priest, who in the age of thirty five learned from his mother, that he was not her biological child, had Jewish descent and was born in a Jewish ghetto. Later on, he managed to find the names of his biological parents and add to his Polish name (Romuald Weksler) the name of his real father (Jakub Waszkinel). Despite the fact that Weksler-Waszkinel self-identifies himself with a Jew, he continues to perform the duties of a Roman Catholic priest. Additionally, Romuald Jakub Weksler-Waszkinel is actively engaged in various activities, aiming at reconciliation of different peoples and religions.

Henio Zytomirski 

Henio Żytomirski is a Jewish boy that was born and brought up in Lublin. At the age of nine he was murdered in a gas chamber at Majdanek concentration camp.

The part of exposition in the "Grodzka Gate" is devoted to Henio Żytomirski. Apart from that the Center organizers different commemorating events on regular basis such as «Listy do Henia». There was also Henio's profile on Facebook. Henio's profile was moderated by Piotr Brożek, the "Grodzka Gate" employee. On boy's behalf he was sharing pictures and posts in Polish. Eventually, the profile gained friends among foreigners, who translated it into their mother tongues. The Center collected a sizable piece of data about Henio (including the letters and pictures sent by his family to the relatives), that enabled it to create a rather in-depth reconstruction of boy's life. But due to the violation of Facebook regulations (creating an impostors account) Henio Żytomirski page was deleted in July 2010.

"Oral History" 
Since 1998 the "Grodzka Gate" has been implementing the project «Historia Mówiona». It is based on collecting of audio and video recorded memories of witnesses of various historical events. Pursuant to oral history guidelines, the "Grodzka Gate" collected memories of almost 2,000 people and recordings of more than 3,000 hours of audio and video materials. The main topics of the interviews are mundane life, education, intercultural reciprocity, World War II, The Holocaust, Polish-Jewish relations during the war and opposition and underground publishing during the years of The Polish People's Republic. Gathered materials constitute the largest collection of this kind in Poland, which is available in the Internet. Every file fulfills the requirements of The Dublin Core Metadata Initiative and is stored in the system dLibra.

Compiled data is actively applied to other projects carried out by the center, such as exhibitions, installations, paratheatrical plays, educational activities etc., so as to create a proper atmosphere and "breathe in some life" and personality into history.

Separate departments of the "Grodzka Gate" 
Lublin Underground Route is one of the separate departments of the "Grodzka Gate", opened for visitors in 2006. It is 280-meters long trail that serves touristic and educational purposes and runs beneath the 16th -17th century houses of the Old town. Its starting point is the Royal Tribunal from which it goes under the streets Złota and Archidiakońska and ends on Plac Po Farze. In the course of the trail the visitors encounter fourteen exposition halls with replica models, reflecting the history of Lublin since the 8th century. The highlight of the route is a big multimedia model of the great fire of Lublin in 1719.

Museum of printing House of Words on Żmigród, 1 is another separate department of "The Grodzka Gate". It was established in 2006. Initially, it was called The Chamber of printing. The second opening of the institution took place on October 3, 2014. Renewed exhibition pays special attention to the value of words – printed and oral ones – in social life and culture. House of Words unveils for its visitors all major stages of the book creation process – pagination, printing of pictures, typography etc. Some activities of the institution are targeted to underline the role of "the liberty of speech" as the marker of social changes. Numerous workshops organized there set great store on reading and its promotion.

References

Links 
 Steve Lipman. The Gate To Poland’s Jewish Life // The Jewish Week, 11/06/2012

Polish culture
Lublin
1998 establishments in Poland
Jews and Judaism in Lublin